Emilia Iris Nuyado Ancapichún (San Pablo, August 17, 1968)  is a Chilean politician of Mapuche-Huillliche descent. Since March 11, 2018 she has been a member of the Chamber of Deputies  representing the 25th district in the Los Lagos Region. She also became one of the first two Mapuche women elected to the Chilean Congress, together with her conservative counterpart Aracely Leuquén.

Political career 
A member of the Socialist Party of Chile since 2000, she had been a council member in the commune of San Pablo (Los Lagos region) for four terms. She is also an advisor to the National Corporation for Indigenous Development (Conadi) and has served three terms. In both positions, she was elected by popular vote obtaining majority vote.
She participated in parliamentary elections of 2017, running for the seat of deputy representing district 25 (Osorno, San Juan de la Costa, San Pablo, Puyehue, Río Negro, Purranque, Puerto Octay, Fresia, Frutillar, Llanquihue, Puerto Varas, Los Muermos). She was elected with 8,142 votes, equaling 6.3%.

References 

1968 births
Chilean socialists
Socialist Party of Chile politicians 
Living people
Mapuche women
Members of the Chamber of Deputies of Chile
Women members of the Chamber of Deputies of Chile
Huilliche people
People from Osorno Province